The 1995 South Asian Games (or 7th SAF Games) were held in Madras, India between 18 and 27 December 1995.

Medal tally

Sports

 (debut)

  Swimming

References

External links 
 https://www.ocasia.org/games/28-madras-1995.html

South Asian Games
1995 South Asian Games
South Asian Games
S
South Asian Games, 1995
1995 in Asian sport
Multi-sport events in India
Sports competitions in Chennai
1990s in Chennai